Yong Zhao is an American educator and currently the New Foundation Professor at the University of Kansas.

He earned a bachelor's degree in English language education from Sichuan International Studies University and a master's in education and a doctorate in educational psychology both from the University of Illinois at Urbana-Champaign.

References

Year of birth missing (living people)
Living people
University of Kansas faculty
Sichuan University alumni
University of Illinois College of Education alumni